= Transverse lesion =

Transverse lesion is a generic term for the two kinds of paralysis:

- Paraplegia, caused by damage in range of the thoracic vertebrae
- Tetraplegia, caused by damage in range of the cervical vertebrae
